Mascaras may refer to the following places in France:
 Mascaras, Gers, a commune in the Gers department
 Mascaras, Hautes-Pyrénées, a commune in the Hautes-Pyrénées department

See also 
 Mascara (disambiguation)